North Korea ranks among some of the most extreme censorship in the world, with the government able to take strict control over communications. North Korea sits at the bottom of Reporters Without Borders' 2022 Press Freedom Index, ranking 180 out of the 180 countries investigated.   

All media outlets are owned and controlled by the North Korean government. As such, all media in North Korea get their news from the Korean Central News Agency. The media dedicate a large portion of their resources toward political propaganda and promoting the personality cult of Kim Il-sung, Kim Jong-il, and Kim Jong-un. The government of Kim Jong-un still has absolute authority over and control of the press and information and has been repeatedly ranked one of the top 5 countries in the world with the least amount of media freedom.

Impact of censorship 
Censorship is a form of media monopoly, where the government oversees all media content in order to maintain obedience. North Korea utilizes a three-tiered approach to control its citizens at the ideological, physical, and institutional level. This applies not only to North Korean residents but also to visitors. 

While this media censorship is harmful for many due to its harsh punishments for those who obtain unapproved content, it is most destructive to children. Since children are more impressionable, they are easier to manipulate, and North Korea takes advantage of this by pushing its own agenda. Kim Jong-un only prioritizes what he deems to be pertinent information, forcing adolescents to think the same as their leader, without any hope for change.

As for adults, the UN Commission of Inquiry (COI) acknowledges multiple violations of human rights in North Korea that are connected to censorship and governmental control, specifically violations of freedom of thought and expression.

There are even some extremes, documented in a report by the U.S. Department of State that include forced labor, rape, forced abortions, and many other horrific human rights violations in the country. One official documented in the report is Ri Thae-chol, who is a first vice minister of the Ministry of People’s Security. The MPS oversees and operates strict labor camps that are known for their abuse and torture of its citizens.

Journalists’ safety is also impacted by censorship. According to Reporters Without Borders the Korean Central News Agency (KCNA) restricts and controls the production and distribution of information while also prohibiting independent journalism. Over the years journalists in North Korea have faced many safety hazards when working in the field. They have been arrested, deported, sent to forced labor camps, and even killed.

History

Kim Il-sung (Leader from 1948–1994) 

Kim Il-sung was born an ordinary man named Kim Sung-ju on April 15, 1912, at the peak of European and Japanese imperialism. Kim Il-sung's tenure was marked by human rights abuses, such as prison camps and harsh censorship. Kim Il-sung's policies are still in effect as of September 2017. As of 2017, all local North Korean media outlets are run by the state. Radios and television sets are modified to receive only approved channels.

North Korea's biggest economic, political, and military aid under Kim Il-sung was the Soviet Union. Joseph Stalin reportedly handpicked Kim Il-sung, who was a fluent Russian speaker, to lead North Korea in 1948. After the foundation of the country, Kim Il-sung launched the Concentrated Guidance Campaign. This was a census to determine the political opinions of North Koreans. Soviet influence in North Korea was endorsed under Kim Il-sung. The degree of censorship seen in North Korea today began with the nationalization of major industries, labor reforms, and the seizure of privately owned land. North Korea maintains a cult of personality around Kim Il-sung as of 2017.

1946–present: The Korean Central News Agency 

The Korean Central News Agency (KCNA) is the state news agency of North Korea. The KCNA was established on December 5, 1946. The agency publishes the views of the North Korean government for foreign news outlets to consume and cite. According to its website, the KCNA "speaks for the Workers' Party of Korea and the  government". It is the primary method by which the North Korean government publishes its views outside of the country.

The KCNA is responsible for all news in North Korea and also distributes photos. Their content is available in Korean, English, Spanish, and Japanese. From January 1, 2011, the site also began offering video. The KCNA often broadcasts North Korean propaganda. It has also reported alleged achievements of North Korea, such as its alleged space program and its standard of living as compared to the United States. These claims have been proven false. The KCNA frequently publishes articles concerning "imperialism" from the United States and South Korea. The KCNA acts as the nation's public relations and multimedia firm, with news that is not dissimilar to propaganda. South Korea's Ministry of Defence maintains a group of readers who try to interpret the significance of the news agency's output. Some themes the KCNA consistently covers include denouncing the actions of the United States and Japan as well as promoting the celebrity and personality of Kim Jong-un and Kim Jong-Il. Their 2,000 employees are under strict control to make sure they report in favor of their country.

Jang Song-thaek was considered the second most powerful figure in North Korea next to Kim Jong-un before he was executed because he was seen as a “counter-revolutionary” to the government. After his death in 2013, it is reported that 35,000 articles of Korean-language original reporting were deleted by the KCNA and his name was taken off every article in one of the outlet's biggest censorship crackdowns.

Kim Jong-il (Leader from 1994–2011) 
Kim Jong-il was made commander-in-chief and head of the military affairs commission by his father Kim Il-sung in the spring of 1994. Later that year in July, Kim Il-sung died. Kim Jong-il became the next member of the Kim dynasty to govern North Korea. Kim Jong-il upheld his father's authoritarian regime and strict censorship. He was known for using military propaganda to distract North Korean citizens from their lack of freedoms and access to outside information. Despite only giving citizens access to hyper-militarized government propaganda, many cell phones and DVDs were obtained illegally under Kim Jong-il.

In 1983, Kim Jong-il's book The Great Teacher of Journalists was translated into English. In this book, Kim Jong-il guides journalists to take the best pictures of their leader, study their leader's works, and instill loyalty to their leader in others. Kim Jong-il includes stories of his remarkable feats in this book, detailing a time when he saved a reporter from death and when he edited a writer's political essay to perfection.

2004–2008: Cell phone ban 
The North Korean government has implemented policies to prevent outside sources of information from reaching the people of North Korea. Starting in the 1990s when famine overtook the country, traders used cell phones as a means to illegally bring food and goods across the border. 
 
In December 2008 Orascom Telecom, an Egyptian company introduced North Korea to Koryolink, a 3G network. Internet access is permitted only for foreign travelers or the elite. By 2015, three million North Koreans had subscribed to Koryolink. Users of Koryolink must apply for permission to subscribe and are “subject to controls and surveillance by at least eight ministries and organizations between the party, state and army.” The network does not allow any access to international calls. Users sometimes will receive propaganda messages.
 
In 2013, foreigners were granted 3G mobile phone Internet access by monthly data plan; the service could be implemented via USB modem or SIM Card. Recently, with more government awareness of alternative access to external information, increased security measures to eliminate these resources have been enacted. This includes higher border security where illicit cell phones gain access to China's mobile networks.

These phones could be vehicles for releasing detailed news of harsh ruling within the country which is prohibited. Beyond punishment for those using phones within the country, a danger exists for escapees spreading knowledge of the country's extreme laws. Text messages and cell phone photographs are sent to external journalists and activists in South Korea to spread knowledge of the conditions. Some North Koreans act as journalists and sources by sending information and sharing stories. Prominent news accounts surrounding Kim Jong-un's ankle surgery and his wife, Ri Sol-ju's 2012 pregnancy were released from these insiders.
 
As social media and news applications via smartphones become the common thread of news outlets, North Korea pushes further curtailment. A tightly controlled cyberspace exists within the country where a small number of upper-class citizens have access to an intranet, called Kwangmyong. In contrast to the otherwise global World Wide Web, this independent resource provides communication between industry, universities, and government. It is used to spread information through chats and emails which are both monitored and filtered by the government, allowing only a select group of researchers, propagandists, and media workers to access state media and items which have been removed from the public's Internet.

Kim Jong-un (Leader from 2011–present) 

Kim Jong-un continues his predecessors' rule and worked to consolidate power since becoming the supreme leader of North Korea on December 28, 2011. He ordered the execution of his uncle, Jang Song-thaek, and allegedly commanded the assassination of his older half-brother, Kim Jong-nam.

Kim Jong-un keeps North Korea under his surveillance through extreme censorship. As of April 2020, the regime has a press freedom score from the Press Freedom Index rankings (made by Reporters Without Borders) of 83.4, with 100 being the worst score, and is ranked last in global rankings of 180 countries. North Korean journalists must belong to the ruling Workers' Party of Korea (WPK) and adjust their reportings to positively reflect Kim Jong-un's leadership. Foreign media are not welcomed and are often used as scapegoats by North Korean media. Failure to follow strict guidelines as set forth by the WPK can lead to imprisonment, forced labor, or death.

Human rights violations in North Korea raise global concern. Kim Jong-un's regime is notorious for torture, mysterious disappearances, and sexual violence.  Each layer of the government is structured to expel potential political threats and disseminate the ideology of Kim Jong-un, and those who attempt to circumvent censorship face steep consequences.

Radio and television censorship

Radio or television sets that can be bought in North Korea are preset to receive only the government frequencies and sealed with a label to prevent tampering with the equipment. It is a serious criminal offence to manipulate the sets and receive radio or television broadcasts from outside North Korea. In a party campaign in 2003, the head of each party cell in neighborhoods and villages received instructions to verify the seals on all radio sets.

According to the Daily NK, it is possible to broadcast news for North Korea through short-wave radio. Possessing a short-wave radio is against the law in North Korea, but the radios are allegedly confiscated and resold by corrupted agents of the secret police. 

High-ranking officials have access to cellphones and the internet while others are limited to the programed government stations that broadcast propaganda. Every television is monitored and inspected throughout each year to ensure there are no outside stations being transmitted illegally. Additionally, songs heard on both televisions and radios are supervised to be based on praising communism and the party leaders, with the superstition that members of the Kim family are writing them. 

"A Quiet Opening: North Koreans in a Changing Media Environment," a study commissioned by the U.S. State Department and conducted by InterMedia and released May 10, 2012, found that despite strict regulations, North Koreans, particularly the elites, have increased access to news and other media outside the state-controlled media authorized by the government. While access to the internet is controlled, radio and DVDs are common media accessed, and in border areas, television. Up to one in two urban households own a Notel (also called Notetel), a portable media player made in China which has been popular in North Korea since about 2005 and was legalized in 2014 and has been credited with facilitating the extension of the "Korean Wave" (Hallyu, the increase of the popularity of South Korean pop culture internationally) into North Korea.

As of 2011, USB flash drives were selling well in North Korea, primarily used for watching South Korean dramas and films on personal computers.

Journalism
North Korea is ranked second to the bottom of the Press Freedom Index rankings published annually by Reporters Without Borders. From 2002 through 2006, the country was listed as the worst in the world, and from 2007 to 2016, it was listed second to last (behind Eritrea) of some 180 countries. In 2017 and 2018, North Korea was ranked the worst again. In 2019, it was rated second to last, above Turkmenistan. In 2020, it was once again ranked last.

To become a journalist in North Korea, one has to graduate from college. After an ideology review and a strict background check, the student is drafted by the college dean and the managers. The drafted journalist will normally go through a probation period of 4 to 5 years and is then stationed after an assessment.

In North Korea, journalism as a job is to guard, defend, and advocate for both the party and party leaders. Since the role is defined as being a political activist and a fighter who can mobilize a crowd, a journalist in North Korea should be deemed a supporter of Kim Il-sung and a fervent political activist, with a war correspondent spirit and political qualification. Journalists in North Korea are reeducated continuously.

The organization that takes charge of the reeducation of journalists in North Korea is the 'Chosen Reporter Alliance'. It is the strongest and the most systematized organization among the reporters and journalists' political idea education organizations. The organization trains journalists and reporters on philosophy, economics, world history, world literature, and foreign languages.

Arguing about the contradictions in the system of North Korea itself is considered treason and is treated as a major violation in North Korean society. Over 70 percent of reports of Korean Central Broadcasting are allotted for Kim's idolization and propaganda system. The rest of the reports are spent on blaming and predicting the collapse of the United States, Japan, and South Korea.

The reporters in North Korea spend their time writing articles that reflect North Korea in a positive light. Kim Jong-il used to punish the people who wrote from a different point of view, saying "Words describe one's ideas."

After re-education, a journalist who works for over 15 years and has made a major contribution is titled a 'distinguished journalist'.

Internet policies

In 2006, Julien Pain, head of the Internet Desk at Reporters Without Borders, described North Korea as the world's worst Internet black hole, in its list of the top 13 Internet enemies.
	
Internet access is not generally available in North Korea. Only some high-level officials are allowed to access the global internet. In most universities, a small number of strictly monitored computers are provided. Other citizens may get access only to the country's national intranet, called Kwangmyong. Content on Kwangmyong is curated by Korea Computer Center. Foreigners can access the internet using the 3G phone network. However, the IT industry has been growing and Internet access is starting to increase within North Korea. With few exceptions, Kwangmyong is completely separate from the global internet as a means for North Korea to use private state-controlled resources which is completely regulated by the regime. This intranet is difficult for foreign adversaries to access, and therefore allows the country to maintain its own private internet.

The North Korean Ullim, an Android-based tablet computer available since 2014, has a high level of inbuilt surveillance and controls. The tablet takes screenshots of apps opened by the user and saves browsing history. The tablet also only allows access to a limited number of approved applications, shares watermarking data to track the distribution of content between people and only allows users to access content created on the tablet or from the tablet. Content sent from other users or third party platforms cannot be accessed. 

As of 2022, ordinary citizens with mobile devices do not have access to the global internet. Instead, these individuals are only able to access Kwangmyong, that is operated by the country. In terms of global internet access, this privilege is only granted to a small number of North Korean elites. Internet access is restricted to military and government business.

See also

Media of North Korea
Telecommunications in North Korea
North Korean postal service
Propaganda in North Korea
Mass surveillance in North Korea
Human rights in North Korea
Cyberactivism in North Korea

References

External links
The Daily-NK - The Hub of North Korean News
Free North Korea Radio
North Korea Reform Radio

 
Politics of North Korea
Communications in North Korea
Mass media in North Korea